Matthew Winston is an American actor. He is the son of special effects artist Stan Winston.

Career
Winston's television appearances include the HBO dramas Six Feet Under and John from Cincinnati, and as Crewman Daniels in Star Trek: Enterprisecentral to the Temporal Cold War plot line that runs through the series' four seasons.

Filmography

Film appearances 
 Wes Craven's New Nightmare (1994) as Charles 'Chuck' Wilson
 Mr. October (1996) as Zack
 The Peacemaker (1997) as UN official
 Halloween H20: 20 Years Later (1998) as Detective Matt Sampson
 Fight Club (1999) as Seminary Student
 Passport to Paris (1999) (V) as Jeremy Bluff
 Galaxy Quest (1999) as Technician #1
 Keeping the Faith (2000) as Matt
 Crocodile Dundee in Los Angeles (2001) as Limo Driver
 A.I. Artificial Intelligence (2001) as Executive
 Totally Blonde (2001) as Peon
 About Schmidt (2002) as Gary Nordin
 Deliver Us from Eva (2003) as Oscar
 The Core (2003) as Luke Barry
 Death to the Supermodels (2004) as Gerd
 Kicking & Screaming (2005) as Tom Hanna
 Little Miss Sunshine (2006) as Pageant MC
 Zodiac (2007) as John Allen
 I Now Pronounce You Chuck and Larry (2007) as Glen Aldrich
 The Boy Who Cried Werewolf (2010) as David Sands
 Starstruck (2010) as Alan Smith
 Harbinger Down (2015) as Stephen
 Traceroute (2016) as himself

Miscellaneous crew 
 Jurassic Park (1993) as Puppeteer

Television guest appearances 

 
 She Spies playing Mel Hoover in episode: "Fondles" (episode # 1.5) 21 October 2002
 NYPD Blue playing Marshall Kopek in episode: "Arrested Development" (episode # 10.12) 14 January 2003
 John Doe playing Scout in episode: "Ashes to Ashes" (episode # 1.14) 14 February 2003
 Six Feet Under playing Terry in episode: "The Trap" (episode # 3.5) 30 March 2003
 CSI: Crime Scene Investigation playing Brian Kelso in episode: "Precious Metal" (episode # 3.18) 3 April 2003
 Six Feet Under playing Terry in episode: "Timing & Space" (episode # 3.7) 13 April 2003
 John Doe playing Scout in episode: "Remote Control" (episode # 1.20) 18 April 2003
 Six Feet Under playing Terry in episode: "Tears, Bones & Desire" (episode # 3.8) 20 April 2003
 John Doe playing Samuel Donald Clarkson in episode: "The Rising" (episode # 1.21) 25 April 2003
 Monk playing Brian Babbage in episode: "Mr. Monk and the Sleeping Suspect" (episode # 2.7) 8 August 2003
 Friends playing a desk clerk in episode: "The One with the Home Study" (episode # 10.7) 13 November 2003
 Star Trek: Enterprise playing Temporal Agent Daniels in episode: "Carpenter Street" (episode # 3.11) 26 November 2003
 7th Heaven playing Mitch in episode: "Paper or Plastic?" (episode # 9.12) 2005
 Without a Trace playing Steven Pine in episode: "Life Rules" (episode # 2.13) 29 January 2004
 Star Trek: Enterprise playing Temporal Agent Daniels in episode: "Azati Prime" (episode # 3.18) 3 March 2004
 Star Trek: Enterprise playing Temporal Agent Daniels in episode: "Zero Hour" (episode # 3.24) 26 May 2004
 Reno 911! playing a German acrobat in episode: "Religion in Reno" (episode # 2.5) 7 July 2004
 Six Feet Under playing Terry in episode: "The Black Forest" (episode # 4.10) 22 August 2004
 Las Vegas playing Walker Dortch in episode: "The Count of Montecito" (episode # 2.2) 20 September 2004
 Star Trek: Enterprise playing Temporal Agent Daniels in episode: "Storm Front" (episode # 4.1) 8 October 2004
 Star Trek: Enterprise playing Temporal Agent Daniels in episode: "Storm Front (Part II)" (episode # 4.2) 15 October 2004
 Charmed playing Manny in episode: "Witchness Protection" (episode # 7.10) 28 November 2004
 The Suite Life of Zack & Cody playing Tim in episode: The Fairest of Them All
 Hannah Montana playing Fermaine in episode: Lilly, Do You Want to Know a Secret? (Episode 1.1) 24 March 2006
 Grey's Anatomy playing Frank in episode: "Staring at the Sun" (Episode #3.8) 16 November 2006
 Chuck (Episode #2.17) 23 March 2009
 Scrubs playing Dr. Jeffrey Steadman in episode: "My Finale" (episode # 8.18) 6 May 2009
 Pushing Daisies playing Michael Brunt in episode: "Water and Power" (episode # 2.12) 6 June 2009
 Castle (TV series) playing Evan Hinkle in episode The Double Down (episode 2.02) September 2009
 Desperate Housewives playing Lazaro in episodes Any Moment and  With So Little to Be Sure Of

Television appearances 

 John from Cincinnati as Barry Cunningham
 Suite Life of Zack & Cody as Tim
 Zoey 101 as a teacher
 Hannah Montana as Fermaine
 Sabrina The Teenage Witch as Bob, the annoying neighbor

References

External links

Living people
Place of birth missing (living people)
American male film actors
American male television actors
American male voice actors
American people of Jewish descent
Exit Players alumni
Year of birth missing (living people)